Anisocarpus madioides (syn. Madia madioides) is a North American species of flowering plant in the family Asteraceae known by the common name woodland madia.

Description
Anisocarpus madioides is a perennial herb growing up to about 75 centimeters in height, its stem coated in rough hairs and stalked resin glands. The lower leaves are up to 12 centimeters long, oppositely arranged, and fused around the stem at the bases. The upper leaves are much smaller and often alternately arranged. The inflorescence produces several flower heads on long peduncles, each with a rounded involucre of glandular phyllaries. The heads bear yellow ray florets up to a centimeter long and many disc florets. The fruit is an achene a few millimeters long, usually with a small pappus. Flowers bloom April to September.

Distribution and habitat
Anisocarpus madioides is native to the west coast of North America on Vancouver Island in the Canadian Province of British Columbia and in the US States of Washington, Oregon, and California. It is a plant of forest and woodland habitat. Most of the populations occur in the Cascades and in the Coast Ranges from Vancouver Island to San Luis Obispo County, but there are additional collections from the foothills of the northern Sierra Nevada and from the Agua Tibia Mountains of San Diego County.

References

External links
 Calflora Database: Anisocarpus madioides (Woodland madia)
Jepson Manual eFlora (TJM2) treatment of Anisocarpus madioides
United States Department of Agriculture Plants Profile
UC Calphotos Photo gallery of Madia madioides

Madieae
Flora of British Columbia
Flora of the West Coast of the United States
Flora of California
Flora of the Klamath Mountains
Natural history of the California Coast Ranges
Natural history of the Peninsular Ranges
Plants described in 1841
Taxa named by Thomas Nuttall
Flora without expected TNC conservation status